The tropical and subtropical dry broadleaf forest is a habitat type defined by the World Wide Fund for Nature and is located at tropical and subtropical latitudes. These seasonal droughts have great impact on all living things in the forest.

Deciduous trees predominate in most of these forests, and during the drought a leafless period occurs, which varies with species type. Because trees lose moisture through their leaves, the shedding of leaves allows trees such as teak and mountain ebony to conserve water during dry periods. The newly bare trees open up the canopy layer, enabling sunlight to reach ground level and facilitate the growth of thick underbrush. Trees on moister sites and those with access to ground water tend to be evergreen. Infertile sites also tend to support evergreen trees. Three tropical dry forest ecoregions, the East Deccan dry evergreen forests, the Sri Lanka dry-zone dry evergreen forests, and the Southeastern Indochina dry evergreen forests, are characterized by evergreen trees.

Though less biologically diverse than rainforests, tropical dry forests are home to a wide variety of wildlife including monkeys, deer, large cats, parrots, various rodents, and ground dwelling birds. Mammalian biomass tends to be higher in dry forests than in rain forests, especially in Asian and African dry forests. Many of these species display extraordinary adaptations to the difficult climate.

This biome is alternately known as the tropical and subtropical dry forest biome or the tropical and subtropical deciduous forest biome.

Geographical variation

Dry forests tend to exist in the drier areas north and south of the tropical rainforest belt, south or north of the subtropical deserts, generally in two bands: one between 10° and 20°N latitude and the other between 10° and 20°S latitude. The most diverse dry forests in the world occur in western and southern Mexico and in the Bolivian lowlands. The dry forests of the Pacific Coast of northwestern South America support a wealth of unique species due to their dry climate. The Maputaland-Pondoland bushland and thickets along the east coast of South Africa are diverse and support many endemic species. The dry forests of central India and Indochina are notable for their diverse large vertebrate faunas. Madagascar dry deciduous forests and New Caledonia dry forests are also highly distinctive (pronounced endemism and a large number of relictual taxa) for a wide range of taxa and at higher taxonomic levels. Trees use underground water during the dry seasons.

Biodiversity patterns and requirements

Species tend to have wider ranges than moist forest species, although in some regions many species do display highly restricted ranges; most dry forest species are restricted to tropical dry forests, particularly in plants; beta diversity and alpha diversity high but typically lower than adjacent moist forests.

Effective conservation of dry broadleaf forests requires the preservation of large and continuous areas of forest. Large natural areas are required to maintain larger predators and other vertebrates, and to buffer sensitive species from hunting pressure. The persistence of riparian forests and water sources is critical for many dry forest species. Large swathes of intact forest are required to allow species to recover from occasional large events, like forest fires.

Dry forests are highly sensitive to excessive burning and deforestation; overgrazing and exotic species can also quickly alter natural communities; restoration is possible but challenging, particularly if degradation has been intense and persistent.

Ecoregions

Afrotropical realm

 Cape Verde Islands dry forests
 Madagascar dry deciduous forests
 Zambezian cryptosepalum dry forests

Australasian realm

 Lesser Sundas deciduous forests
 New Caledonia dry forests
 Sumba deciduous forests
 Timor and Wetar deciduous forests

Indomalayan realm

 Central Deccan Plateau dry deciduous forests
 Central Indochina dry forests
 Chota Nagpur Plateau
 East Deccan dry evergreen forests
 Irrawaddy dry forests
 Khathiar–Gir dry deciduous forests
 Narmada Valley dry deciduous forests
 Northern dry deciduous forests
 South Deccan Plateau dry deciduous forests
 Southeastern Indochina dry evergreen forests
 Southern Vietnam lowland dry forests
 Sri Lanka dry-zone dry evergreen forests

Nearctic realm

 Sonoran-Sinaloan transition subtropical dry forest

Neotropical realm

 Apure–Villavicencio dry forests
 Atlantic dry forests
 Bahamian dry forests
 Bajío dry forests
 Balsas dry forests
 Bolivian montane dry forests
 Cayman Islands dry forests
 Central American dry forests
 Chaco
 Chiapas Depression dry forests
 Chiquitano dry forests
 Cuban dry forests
 Ecuadorian dry forests
 Hispaniolan dry forests
 Jalisco dry forests
 Jamaican dry forests
 Lara–Falcón dry forests
 Leeward Islands dry forests
 Magdalena Valley dry forests
 Maracaibo dry forests
 Marañón dry forests
 Panamanian dry forests
 Patía Valley dry forests
 Puerto Rican dry forests
 Revillagigedo Islands
 Sierra de la Laguna dry forests
 Sinaloan dry forests
 Sinú Valley dry forests
 Southern Pacific dry forests
 Trinidad and Tobago dry forests
 Tumbes–Piura dry forests
 Veracruz dry forests
 Windward Islands dry forests
 Yucatán dry forests

Oceanian realm

 Fiji tropical dry forests
 Hawaiian tropical dry forests
 Marianas tropical dry forests
 Yap tropical dry forests

See also

 Holdridge life zones in Guatemala
 Seasonal tropical forest
 Tropical vegetation

References

External links
 The Tropical Dry Forest of Costa Rica

 
Terrestrial biomes
Forests
D